Events from the year 1954 in art.

Events
November 18 – Publication of Yves Peintures (in Madrid), the first public showing of Yves Klein's work.
 December – Pablo Picasso begins painting his Les Femmes d'Alger ("The Women of Algiers") series in homage to Delacroix's 1834 painting of the same name and to the memory of Matisse.

Awards
 Archibald Prize: Ivor Hele – Rt Hon R G Menzies, PC, CH, QC, MP
 New Year Honours – Knight Commander of the Order of the British Empire: Jacob Epstein

Exhibitions
 Augustus John at the Royal Academy

Works

 Francis Bacon
 Figure with Meat (Art Institute of Chicago)
 Two Figures in the Grass
 Thomas Hart Benton – The Kentuckian
 John Brack – The Bar (National Gallery of Victoria)
 Terence Cuneo
 The Coronation of Her Majesty Queen Elizabeth II, Westminster Abbey, 2nd June 1953
 The Coronation Luncheon for Her Majesty Queen Elizabeth in Guildhall, 12th June 1953 
 Salvador Dalí
 The Colossus of Rhodes
 Crucifixion (Corpus Hypercubus)
 The Disintegration of the Persistence of Memory
 Young Virgin Auto-Sodomized by the Horns of Her Own Chastity
 Franz Kline – Painting No 2 (Museum of Modern Art, New York)
 Willem de Kooning – Marilyn Monroe
 Fernand Léger – Stained-glass window at University City of Caracas
 L. S. Lowry – Piccadilly Gardens
 Sergei Orlov and others – Statue of Yuriy Dolgorukiy, Moscow
 Abbott Pattison – Iron Horse (sculpture)
 Pablo Picasso – Sylvette
 Norman Rockwell – Breaking Home Ties
 Mark Rothko – Untitled (Yellow and Blue)
 Graham Sutherland – Portrait of Winston Churchill (later destroyed on orders issued by the Prime Minister's wife, Lady Clementine Churchill)
 Victor Vasarely – Hommage á Malévitch (ceramic wall at University City of Caracas)

Exhibitions

Births
 January 19 – Cindy Sherman, American photographer and artist
 February 6 – George Sherwood, American kinetic and landscape sculptor
 September 12 – Robert Gober, American sculptor
 December 6 - Nicola De Maria, Italian painter 
 Lubaina Himid, Zanzibar-born British graphic artist

Deaths
 January 26 – Carl Eldh, Swedish painter and sculptor (b. 1873)
 February 21 – Augustin Lesage, French outsider artist (b. 1876)
 March 13 – César Klein, German painter and designer (b. 1876)
 May 5 – Henri Laurens, French sculptor (b. 1885)
 May 16 – Werner Bischof, Swiss photojournalist (b. 1916)
 May 25 – Robert Capa, Hungarian-born photojournalist (b. 1913)
 June 9 – Alain LeRoy Locke, American patron of the arts (b. 1886)
 July – Gaetano Orsolini, Italian sculptor, medallist and engraver (b. 1884)
 July 3 – Reginald Marsh, American painter (b. 1898)
 July 13 – Frida Kahlo, Mexican painter (b. 1907)
 August 28 – Leonid Sherwood, Russian sculptor (b. 1871)
 September 8
 Sigvald Asbjørnsen, Norwegian American sculptor (b. 1867)
 André Derain, French painter and illustrator (b. 1880)
 October 15 – Elwin Hawthorne, English painter (b. 1905)
 October 18 – Einar Jónsson, Icelandic sculptor (b. 1874)
 November 3 –  Henri Matisse, French painter, sculptor and printmaker (b. 1869)
 December 23 – René Iché, French sculptor (b. 1897)

See also
 1954 in fine arts of the Soviet Union

References

 
Years of the 20th century in art
1950s in art